Mount Bryan is a town in north-east South Australia. At the 2016 census, Mount Bryan had a population of 110.

The town was named after a nearby peak, Mount Bryan, which was seen in December 1839 by Governor George Gawler and who named it in honour of Henry Bryan, a young man who became lost and perished of thirst during Gawler's expedition.  Among those accompanying Gawler were Charles Sturt and Henry Inman.

Once the heart of a thriving farming community, including some of Australia's best known Merino sheep studs, the town today is largely represented by the Mount Bryan Hotel—an old pub.

At the northern end of the Mount Lofty Ranges, the views of and from the surrounding hills are scenic. A popular route is north east to Sir Hubert Wilkins cottage, the restored home in which the polar explorer was born and grew up.

The addition of Hallett Wind Farm in the late 2000s and early 2010s has seen wind generating energy from some of the ridge-tops north of Mount Bryan.

The historic Mackerode Homestead is listed on the South Australian Heritage Register.

References
Notes

Citations

Towns in South Australia